Bacolet is a town in Tobago.

Bacolet may also refer to:

 Bacolet, Grenada
Great River of Grand Bacolet
Little River of Great Bacolet
 Bacolet Formation, a geologic formation in Trinidad and Tobago

See also
Bacolet Point, formerly USCGC Point Highland (WPB-82333)